Cameron Moore (born 1994) is an American singer-songwriter.

Early and personal life
Cameron Moore was born in 1994 in Charlotte, North Carolina. He went to University of North Carolina at Asheville, earning his baccalaureate in history and religious studies in 2016.

Music career
His music recording career started in 2013, while his first extended play, Cameron Moore, was released on November 24, 2014.

Discography
EPs
Cameron Moore (November 24, 2014)
Studio Albums
Alpenglow (January 26, 2018)

References

External links
 
 

1994 births
Living people
American performers of Christian music
Musicians from Charlotte, North Carolina
Songwriters from North Carolina
Musicians from Asheville, North Carolina